Radek Koblížek (born 20 October 1997) is a Czech ice hockey forward currently playing for KooKoo of the Finnish Liiga.

Radek Koblížek born in Ivančice (Brno-country district) in the Czech Republic. Koblížek started with hockey, from about 4 years in Rosice u Brna HC Pike Rosice (HC Štika Rosice). After about 4 years, he moved into team, and then joined to HC Kometa Brno.

References

External links
 

1997 births
Living people
Czech ice hockey forwards
Hokki players
Kokkolan Hermes players
Oulun Kärpät players
People from Ivančice
Sportspeople from the South Moravian Region
Czech expatriate ice hockey players in Finland